Yale Tarn is a mountain lake (tarn} located 0.8 miles (1.3 km) northeast of Mount Falconer in Tarn Valley, Victoria Land. This feature is the most eastern of four tarns in the valley named after American universities by the Victoria University of Wellington Antarctic Expedition (VUWAE), 1965–66.

See also
 Harvard Tarn
 Penn Tarn
 Princeton Tarn

References

Lakes of Victoria Land
Scott Coast